G. tinctoria may refer to:
 Gaillonia tinctoria, a plant species endemic to Yemen
 Genista tinctoria, the dyer's greenweed, a plant species
 Gunnera tinctoria, the Chilean rhubarb, a plant species native to southern Chile and neighbour zones in Argentina